Multi-manager investment  is an investment product that consists of multiple specialized funds. Each specialized fund may invest across different sectors and markets, or having managers investing in the same asset class but have different investment styles.  For example, large cap value fund versus large cap growth fund.  

This theory is founded on the premise that not all investment managers are good in all markets and that not all managers are successful at all times. Spreading the investment money across different asset classes or markets allows the investor to achieve the necessary diversification, reducing risk without sacrificing the return.

See also
 Fund of funds
 Manager of managers fund
 Investment management

Investment management